Garjan (also Romanized as Garjān) is a village in Sardabeh Rural District, in the Central District of Ardabil County, Ardabil Province, Iran. At the 2006 census, its population was 936, in 233 families.

References 

Towns and villages in Ardabil County